Taj may refer to:

Buildings
Taj Mahal, a medieval mausoleum in the Indian city of Agra
Taj Palace, an Abbasid palace in medieval Baghdad
Taj-ul-Masajid, mosque in Bhopal
Taj building, Nowshera, Pakistan
Taj Hotels Resorts and Palaces, international hotel chain
The Taj Exotica Hotel & Resort, Dubai

Transport
Tadji Airport, Papua New Guinea (IATA: TAJ)
Taj International Airport, proposed airport in Delhi
Taj Express, train between New Delhi and Agra

Sport
Taj Ahvaz Football Club, Iranian football (soccer) club
Taj Abadan Football Club, Iranian football (soccer) club
Taj Tehran Football Club, Iranian football (soccer) club
Taj F.C. (Palau), Palauan football team

Other
Taj (name), including a list of people with the name
Taj Mahotsav, annual festival in Agra
Taj Ultimate, annual "Ultimate" tournament in Tajima, Japan
Taj Television Ltd., Mumbai
Former name pre-1979 of Esteghlal Tehran FC, football club
National Lampoon's Van Wilder: The Rise of Taj, 2006 film
Taj corridor case, alleged corruption case in India
Taqiyah (cap), a short, rounded skullcap
Taj (album), a 1987 album by American blues artist Taj Mahal
Taj: Divided by Blood, a ZEE5 web-series

See also
Tahj (disambiguation)
Taj Mahal (disambiguation)